Charles "Boxer" Joseph Russell (5 December 1884 – 15 May 1957) was a pioneer Australian rugby union and rugby league footballer and coach. He represented his country in both sports and was one Australia's early dual-code rugby internationals. He was a gold medallist at the 1908 Summer Olympics.

Rugby union career

Russell was a centre/winger whose club rugby was played with the Newtown RUFC in Sydney. He played three Tests for the Wallabies in 1907 against the All Blacks before being selected for the first Wallaby tour of Britain in 1908. He played in both Tests of the tour scoring tries in each. His 24 tries in all games of that tour still stands as Wallaby record. He was a member of the Australian Olympic team who won Gold in London in 1908 in the team captained by Chris McKivat.

Rugby league career
On his return to Australia he joined the fledgling code of rugby league along with 13 of his Olympic teammates. He played at full-back in the first Test against Great Britain in 1910 when Australia hosted the tourists. He was selected in 1911 for the 2nd Kangaroo tour of Great Britain and played in 24 tour matches scoring 9 tries. He played on the wing in the victorious 1st and 2nd Tests of 1911.

During the 1910 Great Britain Lions tour of Australia and New Zealand, the first ever, Russell made his international league début in the first Test in Sydney on 18 June. Four of his former Wallaby teammates also debuted that day John Barnett, Bob Craig, Jack Hickey and Chris McKivat - making them collectively Australia's 11th to 15th dual code internationals. This repeated a similar occurrence two years earlier when five former Wallabies in Micky Dore, Dally Messenger, Denis Lutge, Doug McLean snr and John Rosewell all debuted for the Kangaroos in the first ever Test against New Zealand.

His club football was with Newtown, where he played for 7 seasons. He was captain-coach of the Newtown premiership-winning side of 1910, landing two goals to tie the final against South Sydney 4-4, thus enabling Newtown to win the premiership.

Russell was also selected for the 1911–12 Kangaroo tour of Great Britain.

Post playing
Russell coached Newtown for a number of years including the premiership winning team of 1933.He was a graded referee and served as an Australian rugby league selector for a number of years.

Charles Russell was awarded Life Membership of the New South Wales Rugby League in 1944. In 2008, the centenary year of rugby league in Australia, Russell was named in the Newtown Jets 18-man team of the century.

See also
 Rugby union at the 1908 Summer Olympics

Footnotes

References
 Andrews, Malcolm (2006) The ABC of Rugby League, Austn Broadcasting Corpn, Sydney
 Collective essays (1995) Gordon Bray presents The Spirit of Rugby, Harper Collins Publishers Sydney
 Whiticker, Alan & Hudson, Glen (2006) The Encyclopedia of Rugby League Players, Gavin Allen Publishing, Sydney
 Whiticker, Alan (2004) Captaining the Kangaroos, New Holland, Sydney

External links

1884 births
1957 deaths
Australasia rugby league team players
Australia international rugby union players
Australia national rugby league team players
Australian rugby league administrators
Australian rugby league coaches
Australian rugby league players
Australian rugby league referees
Australian rugby union players
Dual-code rugby internationals
Medalists at the 1908 Summer Olympics
Newtown Jets captains
Newtown Jets coaches
Newtown Jets players
Olympic gold medalists for Australasia
Olympic rugby union players of Australasia
Rugby league players from Sydney
Rugby union players at the 1908 Summer Olympics
Rugby union players from Sydney
Rugby union wings